Qoaling is a constituency and community council in the Maseru Municipality located in the Maseru District of Lesotho. The population in 2006 was 33,989.

Villages
The community of Qoaling includes the villages of Bokhokhoaneng, Borokhoaneng, Botleng, Ha Besele (Qoaling), Ha Chala, Ha Jeke, Ha Keiso (Lithabaneng), Ha Letlatsa (Qoaling), Ha Nkhoahle (Qoaling), Ha Ramakhetheng, Ha Ramatsa, Ha Ratšoana, Ha Seoli, Ha Shelile, Ha Tikoe, Ha Tsautse, Ha Tšiame (Likotsi), Lefikeng (Lithabaneng), Lekhaloaneng, Linakotseng, Lower Seoli, Matšoareng, Matšoareng (Qoaling), Phomolong, Qoaling, Sealong (Ha Tikoe) and Tsoapo-Le-Bolila.

References

External links
 Google map of community villages

Populated places in Maseru District